The Galiara are a Muslim community found in the state of Gujarat in India.

History and origin 

The Galiara derive their name from the Gujarati word gali which means indigo. People who are engaged in the extraction of indigo and dyeing are referred to as Galiara. They are found throughout Gujarat. According to their traditions, the community were originally Hindu, who some four hundred years ago, migrated from Marwar to Junagadh, in search of a livelihood. The Galiara are descendants of these Hindu who converted to Islam under the influence of a Muslim, Musabhai. They are mainly distributed in the districts of Bhavnagar, Rajkot and Junagadh. The community speak Gujarati, although most now have some knowledge of Hindi.

Present circumstances 

The community is divided into a number of clans, the main ones being the Dosani,Rayeen,Khanzada, Mirza and Shaikh. Their traditional occupation has been greatly affected by the growth of paper mills, and many Kagzis have abandoned there paper manufacturing. Many are now involved in petty trade, or have taken to farming. The Ahmadabad Kagzi Jamaat is their caste association, and deals with the various problems of the community.

See also

Muslim Kadia

References 

Social groups of Gujarat
Muslim communities of India
Muslim communities of Gujarat